Archiv für die gesamte Psychologie (often abbreviated Arch. f. d. Psych.) is a German language scientific journal on psychology, founded in 1903 by E. Meumann.
It was the "logical successor" to Wilhelm Wundt's Philosophische Studien.

It was edited until 1945 by Wilhelm Wirth and published by the Deutsche Gesellschaft für Psychologie. It was re-established in 1970 as the Archiv für Psychologie, which was published until 1990.

References

External links
 Arch. f. d. Psych. at WorldCat
 Volume 1 on Google books

Publications established in 1903
Psychology journals
German-language journals
1903 establishments in Germany
Publications disestablished in 1990